Adult Contemporary is a chart published by Billboard ranking the top-performing songs in the United States in the adult contemporary music (AC) market.  In 1995, 11 songs topped the chart, then published under the title Hot Adult Contemporary, based on weekly airplay data from radio stations compiled by Nielsen Broadcast Data Systems.

On the first chart of the year, "I'm the Only One" by Melissa Etheridge moved up to number one, displacing the final number one of 1994, "I'll Make Love to You" by Boyz II Men.  The two songs alternated at number one once again before the Eagles took the top spot with "Love Will Keep Us Alive" in the issue of Billboard dated January 28.  The band had recently reunited more than a decade after breaking up, and "Love Will Keep Us Alive" was the group's second AC chart-topper, twenty years almost to the day after "Best of My Love" had reached number one.  The Eagles were replaced at number one by Madonna with "Take a Bow", the fifth and final Adult Contemporary chart-topper for the singer dubbed the "Queen of Pop" but the longest-running, spending nine weeks atop the chart.

Three consecutive chart-toppers which between them held the top spot from early June until mid-November were taken from film and TV soundtracks.  Canadian singer Bryan Adams spent five weeks at number one with "Have You Ever Really Loved a Woman?" from the film Don Juan de Marco.  It was followed into the top spot in early July by "I'll Be There for You" by the Rembrandts, the theme song from the TV show Friends.  In late August, British singer Seal reached number one with "Kiss from a Rose", which featured on the soundtrack of the film Batman Forever.  Seal's song remained at number one for 12 consecutive weeks, tying the record for the longest run atop the Adult Contemporary chart.  The final AC chart-topper of 1995 was "One Sweet Day", a collaboration between Mariah Carey and Boyz II Men, which reached number one on the final chart of the year.  The R&B ballad would go on to hold the top spot for the first 12 weeks of 1996 for a final total of 13 weeks at number one, another new record for the Adult Contemporary listing, as well as topping Billboards all-genre chart, the Hot 100, for a record-breaking 16 weeks.

Chart history

References

See also
1995 in music
List of artists who reached number one on the U.S. Adult Contemporary chart

1995
1995 record charts
1995 in American music